Eurema simulatrix, the changeable grass yellow, is a butterfly in the family Pieridae. It is found from Burma to Sundaland, Cambodia and the Philippines. The habitat consists of secondary or disturbed habitats including forest clearings, roadsides and riverbanks, parks and gardens.

Adults have two cell spots on the underside of the forewings and a large, almost cleft, reddish-brown apical spot on the forewing.

Subspecies
The following subspecies are recognised:
E. s. simulatrix (Philippines: Mindanao)
E. s. princessae Morishita, 1973 (Palawan)
E. s. tecmessa (de Nicéville & Martin, [1896]) (southern Burma, Peninsular Malaya, southern Thailand, Singapore, Sumatra, Java, Borneo) – de Nicéville's grass yellow
E. s. sarinoides (Fruhstorfer, 1910) (Sikkim to Burma, northern Thailand, Laos) – scarce changeable grass yellow
E. s. littorea Morishita, 1968 (Langkawi)
E. s. inouei Shirôzu & Yata, 1973 (Thailand, Cambodia, Indo-China)
E. s. tiomanica Okubo, 1983 (Tioman)

Eurema irena is sometimes treated as a subspecies of Eurema simulatrix.

References

simulatrix
Butterflies described in 1891
Butterflies of Singapore
Butterflies of Indochina
Butterflies of Borneo
Butterflies of Java